Buchema granulosa is a species of sea snail, a marine gastropod mollusk in the family Horaiclavidae.

It was formerly included within the family Turridae.

Description
The length of the shell attains 11 mm.

Distribution
This species occurs in the Pacific Ocean off Costa Rica and Panama.

References

External links
  Tucker, J.K. 2004 Catalog of recent and fossil turrids (Mollusca: Gastropoda). Zootaxa 682:1–1295.
 

granulosa
Gastropods described in 1834